The Swedish Red-and-White, frequently abbreviated to SRB, is a Swedish breed of dairy cattle. It was created in the 1920s by crossing the Swedish Red Pied and Swedish Ayrshire breeds.

History 

The Swedish Red-and-White breed was formed in 1927 or 1928 by merging the populations of the Swedish Red Pied (often abbreviated to RSB) and Swedish Ayrshire breeds. The traditional Herrgård, Skåne and Småland breeds had already been merged into the Swedish Red Pied at some time between 1892 and 1928. All four of these constituent breeds are now reported to DAD-IS as extinct.

The Swedish Red-and-White is one of the two principal dairy breeds of Sweden, and in 2001 constituted almost 48% of the national dairy herd, just barely outnumbering the Svensk Låglandsboskap or Swedish Friesian breed. In 2014 the total population was reported at just under 354 000.

Characteristics 

The Swedish Red-and-White is red with white markings.

Use 

The Swedish Red-and-White is a dairy breed. The milk has a fat content of 4.3%.

References 

Cattle breeds originating in Sweden
Cattle breeds